Ham Dong-hee(Korean:함동희) is a South Korean wheelchair curler.

Wheelchair curling teams and events

References

External links 

Living people
South Korean male curlers
South Korean wheelchair curlers
Year of birth missing (living people)
Place of birth missing (living people)
21st-century South Korean people